Several vessels have been named William:

  was a merchant vessel built in France in 1770 or 1771. From 1791 she made numerous voyages as a whaler. She also made one voyage in 1793 transporting supplies  from England to Australia. She then resumed whaling, continuing until 1809.
  was launched in Spain in 1788, almost certainly under another name. She was taken in prize in 1797. William sailed as a West Indiaman until 1800 when new owners started to sail her as a slave ship in the triangular trade in enslaved people. She made four complete voyages as a slave ship. A report of her fourth voyage provides insight into the decision making over the planning of the voyage. Spanish privateers captured her in 1805 on her fifth slave voyage.
  was launched at the Bombay Dockyard as a country ship. In 1801 she served as a transport in a naval campaign. In 1809 she made a voyage to London for the British East India Company (EIC). She survived several maritime incidents while sailing as a West Indiaman.
  was launched in Spain under another name and was taken in prize circa 1806. She made one voyage as a Liverpool-based slave ship. Thereafter she traded between Liverpool and Madeira. In 1814 an American privateer captured William.
  was launched in 1811 at Kingston upon Hull. She spent her career as a whaler in the northern whale fishery. She was wrecked on 2 July 1830.
  (or Williams) was launched at Blyth in 1811. In 1818 a letter of marque captured her but she was then released. In October 1819 she fortuitously discovered the South Shetland Islands while on a voyage from Buenos Aires to Valparaiso. She was last listed in 1829.
Daniel Bennet & Sons purchased William for service as a whaler in the British southern whale fishery. She was lost in the Bonin Islands in 1827.

Ship names